Raymond Louis Kennedy (November 26, 1946 – February 16, 2014) was an American singer, songwriter, musician and record producer, based in Los Angeles. His works span multiple genres including R&B, pop, rock, jazz, fusion, acid rock, country and many others. He co-wrote "Sail On, Sailor", one of The Beach Boys' mid-career hits, as well as two hits for The Babys: "Everytime I Think of You" and "Isn't It Time".

Biography
Born in Philadelphia, Kennedy began playing saxophone at age nine. He sang in a cappella groups in New Jersey and Philadelphia before becoming a dancing regular on American Bandstand in 1960. Dick Clark eventually offered to pay him to pantomime playing saxophone with artists such as The Platters, The Drifters, Chubby Checker, Little Richard, and many more.

In 1965, Kennedy recorded his first single as vocalist with then-unknown Kenny Gamble, "Number 5 Gemini," on Guyden Records. That year, Kennedy also auditioned for and received a gig playing tenor sax with Gerry Mulligan, one of the top baritone jazz saxophonists in the world. That led to Kennedy leaving his home in New Jersey, playing various jazz clubs and making his way south.

With drummer Jay David, Kennedy eventually left the tour to play various gigs with Dizzy Gillespie, J.J. Johnson, Buddy Rich and the Gene Krupa Jazz Group, until he decided in 1962 that the lifestyle of a jazz musician was simply not for him.

Kennedy went to Paducah, Kentucky for a few performances with Brenda Lee; one-nighters with Little Richard, Fats Domino, Jerry Lee Lewis, Wilson Pickett, and many others followed. Encouraged by friend Otis Redding, Kennedy shifted his focus back to singing and moved to New York in 1963. He was signed by Ahmet Ertegun to Atlantic Records, recording as Jon and Ray and touring with Jon Mislan (aka Johnny Angel). In 1966, he formed another band named Group Therapy and recorded two albums, then moved to Los Angeles with them in 1968.

Kennedy's first solo album, Raymond Louis Kennedy, was released in 1970. That year, he befriended Dave Mason of Traffic and toured with him in support of Mason's solo album Alone Together. The pair collaborated on the song "Seasons," which would end up on the future Mason solo album Let It Flow. During this period, Kennedy also co-wrote the Beach Boys hit "Sail On, Sailor".

In 1974, Kennedy was featured on the soundtrack to the Brian DePalma cult film Phantom of the Paradise, singing "Life at Last" and a version of "The Phantom's Theme". In the movie, the former song was lip-synched by Gerrit Graham as the character Beef, who performed the song as a Frankenstein-type, flamboyant rocker, constructed by the members of The Undead during a Dr. Caligari-esque performance.

In 1980, Kennedy released a second, self-titled solo album, Ray Kennedy. This album featured the minor hit single "Just for the Moment", which would become Kennedy's only Billboard Hot 100 hit under his own name.

In addition to this solo album, Kennedy spent the next several decades writing, recording and touring with Sly and the Family Stone, Brian Wilson, Dave Mason, Jeff Beck, Barry Goldberg, Maurice White, Aerosmith, Michael Schenker, Engelbert Humperdinck, Wayne Newton, Tanya Tucker, Bill Champlin, Willie Nelson, Mick Fleetwood and others.

Albums

Singles/contributed tracks

References

External links
 http://www.raymondlouiskennedy.com/about.html
 http://www.raymondlouiskennedy.com/music.html
 
 http://www.fendermusicfoundation.org/news/index.cfm?sec=news&newsID=6
 http://www.discogs.com/Group-Therapy-People-Get-Ready-For-Group-Therapy/release/1447635
 http://www.soulfulkindamusic.net/guyden.htm

Musicians from Philadelphia
Michael Schenker Group members
1946 births
2014 deaths
American rock saxophonists
American male saxophonists
American male songwriters
Record producers from Pennsylvania
Musicians from Los Angeles
Songwriters from Pennsylvania
Songwriters from California
Record producers from California
20th-century American saxophonists